Chalastra aristarcha, the silver fern moth, is a moth of the family Geometridae. This species was first described by Edward Meyrick in 1892. It is endemic to New Zealand and is found in the North Island. This species inhabits dense native forest. The larvae feed on the species host plant, the Silver fern, during spring. This species then pupates on top of leaf litter or moss on the ground. The pupation state lasts for approximately 6 weeks. Adult moths are on the wing from October until April but can sometimes also be seen during the winter months. Adults can be disturbed from silver ferns during the day or are seen on the wing at night particularly at Metrosideros perforata when in flower. Adults are attracted to light. It has been hypothesised that the range of C. aristarcha has restricted as a result of urban development and land conversion of its habitat.

Taxonomy 
This species was first described by Edward Meyrick in 1892 using a specimen collected by George Hudson in Wellington and named Selidosema aristarcha. Hudson discussed and illustrated this species using that name both in his 1898 book New Zealand moths and butterflies (Macro-lepidoptera) and his 1928 book The butterflies and moths of New Zealand. In 1988 John S. Dugdale placed this species in the genus Chalastra. He placed this species in that genus as it was included by Meyrick in Selidosema, and had a reduced, rounded uncus and no spinose process on the disc of the valva. This placement was accepted in the New Zealand Inventory of Biodiversity. The male holotype is held at the Natural History Museum, London.

Description 

Hudson described the larva of this species as follows:

Meyrick described the adult male of this species as follows: 

Hudson pointed out that the species varies slightly in size and that the female is a little darker than the male. The females of the species can be larger than the males. Hudson pointed out that the colouration of the adult moth provides protective camouflage for the moth as it resembles the dead leaves of its host plant, the silver fern. This silvery banded colouration can also be found in an unrelated moth species whose larval host is also the silver fern, Ecclitica torogramma.

Distribution 
C. aristarcha is endemic to New Zealand. It is found throughout the North Island. D. E. Gaskin pointed out in 1966 that although Hudson regarded it as common in Wellington he had yet to collect it there. He was of the opinion that the range of this species had contracted as cultivation of land increased.

Habitat 

This species inhabits dense native forest.

Behaviour and life cycle
The larva feed during spring, are very sluggish and can observed on the silvery underside of its host plant. C. aristarcha pupates on the ground under its host plant and amongst leaf detritus and moss. It stays in that state for approximately 6 weeks. Adult moths are on the wing from October until April but can sometimes also be seen during the winter months. Gaskin believed there were two broods but was unsure at which life stage C. aristarcha passed winter as both adults and larvae are present in spring. Adults of this species have been collected by beating its host plant and have been observed in the evening at Metrosideros perforata when in flower. They are attracted to light.

Host species
The larval host species of this moth is the silver fern.

References

Moths described in 1892
Moths of New Zealand
Cidariini
Endemic fauna of New Zealand
Taxa named by Edward Meyrick
Endemic moths of New Zealand